Joanna Moorhead is a British journalist and author who writes for The Guardian, The Independent, The Observer and many other UK newspapers and magazines.  Her book The Surreal Life of Leonora Carrington gained reviews in The Guardian, The Times, Financial Times, Press and Journal, The Herald (Glasgow), The Spectator and Irish Examiner. A second book on Carrington - Surreal Spaces -  exploring the homes, houses and institutions she lived in during her journeys from England to Mexico is to be published in June 2023 (UK) and August 2023 (North America).

References

External links 

British journalists
Living people
Year of birth missing (living people)